The Main Street Station Hotel and Casino and Brewery is a hotel and casino located in downtown Las Vegas,  Nevada.  It is owned by Boyd Gaming.  The casino is connected to California Hotel and Casino by an enclosed skywalk over Main Street.

Main Street Station offers a self-guided tour which includes a portion of the Berlin Wall, stained glass from the Lillian Russell Mansion, doors and facade from the Kuwait Royal Bank, doors from the George Pullman Mansion, Louisa May Alcott pullman car, chandeliers from the Coca-Cola building and Figaro Opera House, and various statues.  The portion of the Berlin Wall is located in the men's restroom and has urinals affixed to it.

History
The property opened as the Holiday International in 1978. The property's casino, operated by Major Riddle, closed in September 1980 after going into bankruptcy. The hotel, a Holiday Inn franchise, closed in 1984, following an extended strike by workers.

The property reopened in 1987 as the Park Hotel and Casino, developed by Japanese investor Katsuki Manabe. The Park closed in 1990.

Main Street Station was initially proposed as a redevelopment project, Church Street Station, controversially including a strip-frontage property acquired via eminent domain whose valuation persists in litigation.  Failing to obtain the property in time, the casino-hotel was developed from the existing Park hotel on an $82 million budget by Florida developer Bob Snow in the image of his then-highly successful Orlando attraction, also called Church Street Station, in August 1991.  The hotel/casino/club-hop in that form lasted less than a year.

Boyd Gaming purchased the defunct property in 1993 for $16.5 million, and also acquired an adjacent lot from the city to use for a parking garage. After spending another $45 million on renovations, Boyd reopened Main Street Station in November 1996. The property is popular among Hawaiians. Nevada casinos were ordered to close in March 2020, due to the COVID-19 pandemic in the state. Although most casinos reopened within a few months, Main Street Station remained closed for more than a year. It reopened on September 8, 2021.

Triple 7 Brewery
Triple 7 Restaurant and Microbrewery is operated on site and serves up to 8 microbrew beers, Six year-round house beers on tap are: Royal Red Ale, High Roller Gold Ale, Marker Pale Ale, Black Chip Porter, IPA, Double Down Hefeweizen. In addition, Triple 7 offers Brewmaster Special and Brewmaster Reserve, which are two rotating/seasonal selections. Some of these have included Mango Hef, Black Cherry Porter, Saison du Trip, Bad Guys Wear Black Imperial Stout, and experimental IPAs.

References

External links

Casinos in the Las Vegas Valley
Downtown Las Vegas
Boyd Gaming
Skyscraper hotels in Las Vegas
Beer brewing companies based in Nevada
Hotels established in 1978
Hotel buildings completed in 1978
Casino hotels
1978 establishments in Nevada